Jasvir Singh Deol (born 1968/1969) is a Canadian politician who was elected in the 2019 Alberta general election to the Legislative Assembly of Alberta representing the electoral district of Edmonton-Meadows. He was previously the federal NDP candidate for the riding of Edmonton Mill Woods during the 2015 Canadian election. Born and raised in Punjab, Deol immigrated to Canada from India in 1993.

Deol serves as the Official Opposition Critic for Multiculturalism for the Alberta New Democratic Party Caucus.

Electoral record

References

Alberta New Democratic Party MLAs
Living people
Politicians from Edmonton
Year of birth uncertain
21st-century Canadian politicians
New Democratic Party candidates for the Canadian House of Commons
Canadian politicians of Indian descent
Canadian politicians of Punjabi descent
Punjabi people
Year of birth missing (living people)